Plectranthus saccatus is a shrub from the mint family Lamiaceae, native to South Africa. The habitat includes forest or shaded situations near the coast.

References

saccatus
Flora of South Africa
Garden plants